Jermaine Woozencroft (born 19 August 1992) is a Jamaican international footballer who plays for Montego Bay United, as a midfielder.

Career
Woozencroft has played club football for Montego Bay United. Woozencraft won the RSPL in 2013-2014 with Montego Bay United.

He made his international debut for Jamaica in 2013.

Honours 
Jamaica National Premier League: 1
2014

References

1992 births
Living people
Jamaican footballers
Jamaica international footballers
Association football midfielders
Montego Bay United F.C. players
National Premier League players